The New Normal is a 2020 Nigerian dramedy film written by Tunde Babalola, produced and directed by Teniola Olatoni under the production studio of Sourmash Stories.  The film stars Richard Mofe Damijo, Mercy Johnson, Broda Shaggi, Bimbo Akintola, Kehinde Bankole, Femi Jacobs, Femi Blaq, Meg Otanwa, and Mofe Duncan.

Premiere 
The movie first premiered on 15 November 2020. The premiere was held at Adam & Eve, Ikeja, was attended by show business executives and movie enthusiasts. Also, on the 20 November 2020, it was screened in over 51 opened cinemas across the country.

Synopsis 
The movie revolves around the individual lives of four families who are faced with different physical and psychological problems. Despite all these problems, they find different ways of coping with their new normals of lives.

Awards and nominations 
The movie was named the Best International Narrative at the annual American Black Film Festival (ABFF) Jury Awards, and the award for Best African Female Filmmaker at the Toronto International Nollywood Film Festival (TINFF)

Cast   
Adunni Ade, Bimbo Akintola, Kehinde Bankole, Yemi Blaq, Mofe Duncan, Zara Udofia Ejoh, Bikiya Graham Douglas, Femi Jacobs, Richard Mofe-Damijo, Sani Mu'azu, Helen Enado Odigie, Mercy Johnson, Kenneth Okolie, Meg Otanwa, Olumide Oworu and Broda Shaggi.

References 

2020 films
Nigerian comedy-drama films